Office national des postes du Mali (La Poste du Mali) is the company responsible for postal service in Mali.

Mali has been a Universal Postal Union member since 21 April 1961, and is a member of the West African Postal Conference.

References

External links 
 
 Meeting Mali's most dedicated postman at BBC News

Communications in Mali
Companies of Mali
Mali
Philately of Mali